The 2016–17 UC Irvine Anteaters men's basketball team represented the University of California, Irvine during the 2016–17 NCAA Division I men's basketball season. The Anteaters were led by seventh year head coach Russell Turner and played their home games at the Bren Events Center as members of the Big West Conference. They finished the season 21–15, 12–4 in Big West play to win the regular season conference championship. As the No. 1 seed in the Big West tournament, they defeated UC Riverside and Long Beach State before losing to UC Davis in the championship game. As a No. 1 seed in their conference tournament who failed to win their conference tournament title, UC Irvine received an automatic bid to the National Invitation Tournament. As a No. 8 seed, they were defeated by No. 1 seed Illinois State in the first round. The team won their third Big West Regular Season title in the past four years and their 5th straight season with at least 20 wins.

Previous season 
The Anteaters finished the 2015–16 season 28–10, 13–3 in Big West play to win a share of the regular season Big West championship. They defeated Cal Poly in the quarterfinals of the Big West tournament to advance to the semifinals where they lost to Long Beach State. They were invited to the CollegeInsider.com Tournament where they defeated North Dakota, Louisiana–Lafayette, and Coastal Carolina to advance to the championship game. In the championship game, they lost to Columbia.

Off-Season

2016 Recruiting Class

Roster

Schedule and results

|-
!colspan=9 style=|  Exhibition

|-
!colspan=9 style=| Non-conference regular season

|-
!colspan=9 style=| Big West regular season

|-
!colspan=9 style=| Big West tournament

|-
!colspan=9 style=| NIT

References

UC Irvine
UC Irvine Anteaters men's basketball seasons
UC Irvine
UC Irvine Anteaters
UC Irvine Anteaters